The Gemil Box is a multi-format box set, self-financed and self-released on 18 November 2013 by the Northern Irish rock band Therapy?. The box was announced on the official site for pre-sale on 23 October, and the track-listing was revealed on 14 November.

It contains remastered CD versions of four previously released A&M Records albums (Nurse, Troublegum, Infernal Love, and Semi Detached); two discs of previously unreleased material recorded between 1989 and 2011; a disc of demos and reworked songs; a DVD featuring the band's UK Sonisphere 2010 performance and two early home video bootlegs from London in 1991 and 1992; a 12" vinyl containing all 16 of the band's original demo songs; and a cassette of an early live performance from Dublin in 1990. Also included is a 24-page book with pictures and notes by original members Andy Cairns and Michael McKeegan, and download codes for the vinyl and cassette. A limited edition release, the box was sold only via the band's official website and included a signed photograph with all pre-orders placed before 16 November 2013. As from November 2015, all remaining copies were only available from Amazon.

A piece written by vocalist/guitarist Andy Cairns just prior to the box set's release:

"This box set was a labour of love for ourselves, our management and Blast studios. It's all been put together and paid for by ourselves. Michael McKeegan, Gerry & Susan our management team and Polly at Blast have really worked hard on a daily basis to get it out before the end of the year.

Most of the unreleased material had been in various band members cupboards and storage unheard since they were recorded and dusted down for the collection. There's a ton of material there which we hope you'll all love.

'Dark Naughty Steps' is a fave of mine that I wanted to be on ABCOL, 'All Low No High' should have been a single but didn't even make it on an album. The re-work of 'Animal Bones' has some sublime bass playing from Mr McKeegan and the drum pattern of 'Glamour of Potential' is Meester Cooper, The Derby Demon, at his finest. Speaking of drum patterns there's a classic one from Fyfe on 'Mind Body Soul' which was a constant in our live sets pre-'Babyteeth'. Watch out too for lots of lovely unheard cello playing from Martin McCarrick.

Most of the photographs in the booklet are from our private collections, taken on Polaroids and cheap cameras in various countries in the world over all of our career. From hotel rooms, tour buses and plain old sightseeing, there's candid shots aplenty and a few wee celebrities chucked in there too.

You might not want to know this but the 'Live at the White Horse' tape languished at the back of my sock drawer for years hidden inside a felt bag. It was only when I moved house for the 5th time that I discovered it. The track on it titled 'Reality Fuck' probably features my personal favourite guitar sound, a holy grail that I've been trying to get back since!".

Problems 
On the day of release, it was noted that the digital files used for both the vinyl and downloadable versions of the 'Meat Abstract' demo tracks suffered from skips, particularly noticeable on "Punishment Kiss". Once informed, the band had the downloadable versions corrected. Unfortunately there was no re-press of the 'Listen You Fuckers' LP to correct the issue so skips are present on all copies.

Track listing 
All songs written by Andrew J. Cairns, unless noted.

Personnel 

 Therapy?
 Andy Cairns – vocals, guitar (1989–present), bass guitar on 'Listen You Fuckers' (tracks 1–4)
 Michael McKeegan – bass guitar (1989–present), guitar on "Bowels of Love"
 Neil Cooper – drums (2002–present)
 Fyfe Ewing – vocals, drums (1989–1995)
 Graham Hopkins – drums, vocals (1996–2001)
 Martin McCarrick – cello, guitar, piano, vocals (1994–2003)

 Additional musicians
 Keith Baxter – drums on 'Listen You Fuckers' (tracks 13–16)
 David James – cello on "Gone"
 Page Hamilton – guitar solo on "Unbeliever"
 Lesley Rankine – vocals on "Lunacy Booth"
 Eileen Rose – vocals on "Femtex"
 Simon Clarke – saxophone on 'Infernal Love'
 David Holmes – insanity on 'Infernal Love'

 Production
 Harvey Birrell – producer ("Nurse"), 2013 remastering ("Nurse", "Troublegum", "Infernal Love", "Semi-Detached")
 Nick Atkins – engineer ("Nurse")
 Chris Sheldon – producer, engineer ("Troublegum" and "Semi-Detached")
 Darren Alison – engineer ("Troublegum")
 Al Clay – producer, engineer ("Infernal Love")
 Matt Sime – producer ("Tramline"), additional engineer ("Semi-Detached")
 Adam Sinclair – audio mixer ("Live at Sonisphere 2010")

References 

Albums produced by Chris Sheldon
Therapy? albums
2013 compilation albums